Adam Gonšenica (born 21 October 1999) is a Slovak slalom canoeist who has competed at the international level since 2014.

He won a silver medal in the K1 team event at the 2021 World Championships in Bratislava.

References

External links

Living people
Slovak male canoeists
1999 births
Medalists at the ICF Canoe Slalom World Championships